Tenmacho Station can refer to:

Temma-chō Station: an underground metro station in Nagoya, Japan
Tenma-cho Station: a tram stop in Hiroshima, Japan